John Blackthorne is the hero of James Clavell's 1975 novel Shōgun, and is loosely based on the life of the 17th-century English navigator William Adams, who was the first Englishman to visit Japan. The character also appears in the 1980 TV miniseries Shōgun, played by Richard Chamberlain.

Fictional biography
In the novel, Blackthorne is a described as a navigator, who is the "first English pilot ever to get through Magellan's Pass", working for Dutch traders in 1598 who navigates his ship, the Erasmus, to Japan, where he and the surviving crew are immediately imprisoned. A Protestant like his crewmates, Blackthorne is branded as a heretic by the Portuguese Jesuits who control all foreign trade in Japan, though the Jesuits are powerless to kill him outright due to local political considerations. Blackthorne is taken to Lord Toranaga (also based on an historical figure, Tokugawa Ieyasu), the daimyō in control of the territory in which Blackthorne and the Erasmus first landed. Toranaga quickly realizes that Blackthorne and his ship present a great opportunity, not only in his dealings with the Portuguese, but also in his struggle with his main rival, Lord Ishido (based on Ishida Mitsunari), over future control of all of Japan. Toranaga orders Blackthorne's imprisonment, not to punish Blackthorne, but to keep him out of Ishido's hands. While in prison Blackthorne meets a Franciscan priest who gives him a much greater understanding of the political and economic situation in Japan, and how the Portuguese and the Jesuits fit into it. The priest also begins teaching Blackthorne the rudiments of the Japanese language.

Having been told by the priest that all who enter the prison are eventually executed, Blackthorne is prepared to die when his name is called (like the historical Adams, the Japanese call him Anjin-san - Mr. Pilot - because his English name is too difficult to pronounce, there being no sounds or characters in Japanese for much of his name). Instead, the guards take him to Osaka Castle, where he is cleaned up and told by Mariko - the Christian wife of one of Toranaga's samurai who, like Blackthorne, is fluent in Portuguese and Latin - that Lord Toranaga wishes to know more about England and its war against the Spanish and Portuguese.

As a result of a series of events, Blackthorne eventually finds himself very close to Toranaga, saving his life occasionally. He is awarded the titles of hatamoto and samurai, as he begins to understand and deeply respect Japanese culture. However, to complicate matters, he starts to fall in love with the interpreter, Mariko, and they eventually become lovers. Though Blackthorne asks Toranaga to sever Mariko's marriage so she will be free to marry him, Toranaga refuses and orders Blackthorne never to speak of the matter again. In spite of this, Blackthorne becomes a trusted friend of Toranaga.

At the end of the book Toranaga defeats Ishido's forces (this is a reference to the Battle of Sekigahara) and becomes shogun. Though Toranaga secretly had Erasmus burned and beached, he permits Blackthorne to begin constructing another ship as a way to keep him occupied, but also determines that he will never be allowed to leave Japan for the rest of his life. It can be assumed that Blackthorne eventually dies in Japan without ever having returned to England.

Although Blackthorne's later life is never covered in any real detail in Clavell's later Asian Saga novels, Gai-Jin (which features Malcolm Struan the Tai-Pan heir to the Noble House of Struan's) mentions that Blackthorne later built ships for Shogun Toranaga, and had families in Nagasaki and Izu. One of Blackthorne's Nagasaki descendants, Shin Komoda, is mentioned as having been a samurai who died in a brawl shortly before the events in Gai-Jin take place (during the early 1869s). Komoda and his wife Gekko had one son, who was sent to live with his grandparents shortly after Komoda's death.

It is also revealed that Blackthorne is later used by Toranaga to destroy Osaka Castle after the Battle of Sekigahara.

In Clavell's novel Noble House, a minor character named Riko Anjin makes a brief appearance. When main character Ian Dunross (Tai-Pan and a descendant of the Struans) notes her blue eyes, she relates a family legend that she is descended from a shipwrecked Englishman who became a samurai. Dunross considers the story implausible.

Blackthorne, John
Blackthorne, John
Blackthorne, John
Blackthorne, John